Deng Senyue (born 5 February 1992 in Liuzhou, Guangxi Province China) is a retired Chinese individual rhythmic gymnast. She is the 2014 Asian Games silver medalist. She finished 4th in All-around at the 2013 World Championships.

Career 
Deng started rhythmic gymnastics at 6 years old, In 1999, she went to Beijing to pursue gymnastics and was recruited by the China Rhythmic Gymnastics Team. She made her senior international debut at the 2007 Aeon Cup.

In 2009, Deng won the gold medal at the 11th National Games, raising her national ranking to first. She finished 21st in the All-around final and 16th in Team at the 2010 World Championships in Moscow, Russia. Deng won a bronze medal in Hoop at the 2011 Summer Universiade and won the bronze medal in all-around at the 2011 Asian Championships. She then represented China at the 2011 World Championships where she finished 13th in the All-around.

She competed in the individual all-around event at the 2012 Summer Olympics, she narrowly missed the finals placing 11th in the qualifications and did not advance into the Top 10 finals.

Deng won her first World Cup series medal at the 2013 World Cup in Lisbon, Portugal, a bronze in the ribbon final
(she became the first individual rhythmic gymnast from China to medal at the World Cup series). Deng competed at the 2013 Asian Championships in Tashkent, Uzbekistan where she won the all-around bronze medal with Team China winning the bronze medal. At the finals, Deng became the first Chinese rhythmic gymnast to win 2 gold medals, in ball and in ribbon final ahead of Korean Son Yeon-Jae, she also won silver in clubs and hoop. Deng competed at the 2013 Summer Universiade where she finished 8th in all-around and qualified in all 4 event apparatus finals. Deng competed at the 2013 World Games in Cali where she finished 4th in clubs final behind Alina Maksymenko. She then competed at the 2013 World Championships in Kyiv, Ukraine where she qualified to 2 event finals, she finished 8th in hoop and 5th in clubs ahead of Son Yeon-Jae. Deng became the first Chinese rhythmic gymnast to place in the Top 5 at the World Championships by finishing 4th in the All-around at the 2013 World Championships scoring a total of 70.374 points putting her ahead of Korean Son Yeon-Jae. Deng won her second Nationals Games title in Liaoning.

In 2014, Early in the season Deng was recovering from a foot injury, her first international competition was at the 2014 Corbeil-Essonnes World Cup where she finished 8th in all-around. She qualified to 3 event finals and won her second World Cup medal, a bronze in clubs. On August 8–10, Deng competed at the 2014 Sofia World Cup finishing 7th in all-around. She qualified to 2 event finals placing 5th in hoop and 4th in ball behind Son Yeon-Jae. On September 22–27, Deng represented China at the 2014 World Championships where she qualified to 3 event finals, finishing 5th in hoop, 5th in clubs and 6th in ribbon. In the all-around, Deng finished 5th with a total score of 69.766 points, just behind Korean rival Son Yeon-Jae who finished 4th. Deng then flew to Incheon, Korea for the 2014 Asian Games where she won the all-around silver medal again behind Korean rival Son Yeon-Jae.

Deng completed her career at the end of the 2014 Season.

Achievements 
 First Chinese rhythmic gymnast and second Asian to place in Top 5 at Worlds finishing 4th in All-around at the 2013 World Championships.
 First Asian rhythmic gymnast to place in Top 4 in All-around at the World Championships.
 First Chinese rhythmic gymnast to qualify for event apparatus final in the World Championships. (hoop, clubs and ribbon in 2013, 2014 Worlds)
 First Chinese rhythmic gymnast to qualify for All-around final in 4 World Championships in a row. (2010, 2011, 2013, 2014 Worlds)
 First Chinese rhythmic gymnast to win a medal in the World Cup series.
 First Chinese rhythmic gymnast to qualify for all 4 event apparatus finals in 2 Universiade in a row. (2011, 2013 Universiade)
 First Chinese rhythmic gymnast to become 2 time All-around champion in National Games. (2009, 2013)
 Highest Chinese individual rhythmic gymnast finish in 11th place at the 2012 London Olympic Games.

Competitive history

Routine Music Information

References

External links
 
 
 
 

1992 births
Living people
Chinese rhythmic gymnasts
Olympic gymnasts of China
Gymnasts at the 2012 Summer Olympics
Gymnasts from Guangxi
Gymnasts at the 2010 Asian Games
Gymnasts at the 2014 Asian Games
Asian Games medalists in gymnastics
Asian Games silver medalists for China
Medalists at the 2014 Asian Games
Universiade medalists in gymnastics
Universiade bronze medalists for China
Medalists at the 2011 Summer Universiade
21st-century Chinese women